

L-Ron

L-Ron

La Dama
La Dama is a fictional character appearing in American comic books published by DC Comics.

La Dama is a leading figure in El Paso's criminal underworld who was nothing more than an urban legend. Anyone who crosses her will find out how real she is. Her true identity is Amparo, the aunt of Jaime Reyes' friend Brenda del Vacchio. After Brenda was hospitalized by the thugs that were defeated by Blue Beetle, La Dama was in the shadows as she tells the hospital staff to treats Brenda's friends as well. La Dama dispatches Diviner to test Blue Beetle and recruit him to her cause. This mission ends in failure. Amparo talks with Brenda at the restaurant La Petit Monde about her relationship with Jaime. Blue Beetle and the Posse work to spring Posse member Probe from La Dama's prison Warehouse 13 where they encounter La Dama's minion Headmaster. During the fight which also attracted the attention of Peacemaker and Phantom Stranger, Blue Beetle has his encounter La Dama and learns that she is Brenda's aunt. Phantom Strange notes that La Dama will use the villains in Warehouse 13 to make a private army out of them.

In 2011, "The New 52" rebooted the DC Universe. In this continuity, La Dama claims to be an entity older than time. She uses the human alias of Amparo Cardenas and used other pseudonyms like "The Dame", "Lady Styx", and "The Queen of Beings and Things". La Dama killed Brenda del Vacchio's father so that she can take Brenda under her wing.

La Dama speaks with Brutale on the phone about other people being after the Blue Beetle scarab and to get it before the other people can. This group turns out to be the Brotherhood of Evil. Brutale and his fellow operatives Bone-Crusher and Coyote compete with Brotherhood of Evil members Phobia, Plasmus, and Warp to obtain the Blue Beetle scarab as they attack Jaime and Paco. The Blue Beetle scarab then activates and turns Jaime into Blue Beetle. After both sides were defeated, La Dama kills Coyote for her agents' failure.

La Dama in other media
La Dama appears in Catwoman: Hunted, voiced by Jacqueline Obradors. She is seen as a member of Leviathan where she is representing the Central American cartel.

Lady Blackhawk

Lady Eve
Lady Eve is a fictional supervillainess created by Mike W. Barr and Alan Davis, making her first appearance in Batman and the Outsiders #24 (August 1985).

Little is known about Lady Eve's past, but she first met the terrorist cult leader Kobra (Jeffrey Burr) in Egypt where she nursed him back to health. In gratitude, Kobra offered Eve to join him in exchange for a better life. She accepted and eventually became Kobra's lover, as well as a high-ranking member of the Kobra Cult. She and Kobra once hatched a plot to brainwash top officials of the U.S. Army and steal a satellite defense program to blackmail the United States government, but Batman and the Outsiders eventually stopped them both.

Lady Eve would later assemble a second incarnation of Strike Force Kobra. When this version of Strike Force Kobra was defeated by the Eradicator's incarnation of the Outsiders, even after the death of the third Syonide, Lady Eve called Kobra for help, only for him to tell them to surrender. This action caused a strain between Kobra and Lady Eve.

In DC Rebirth, Lady Eve kills a Kobra operative after Katana stole Dr. Helga Jace from them. This leads the Kobra organization into attacking the nearby Markovian village, Lady Eve confronts Katana and the two duel almost to a standstill, until a child distracts Katana. This enables Lady Eve to gain the upper hand and make off with Dr. Jace. Lady Eve has the Kobra soldiers place everybody against the wall. While Katana works to catch up to Dr. Jace, Lady Eve runs into Violet Harper, where she gives the details for her illness and cure. Afterwards, Lady Eve and the Kobra soldiers left her to begin to self-narcotisise. When Lady Eve gets Katana in bondage, the Suicide Squad arrives to rescue Katana. When Lady Eve gets the Soultaker at the time when Katana, Prince Brion Markov, and the Suicide Squad are captured by the Kobra organization, Katana breaks free and kicks the Soultaker out of Lady Eve's hands, while incapacitating her. King Kobra and Lady Eve arrange for Dr. Jace to have an Aurakle bound to a comatose Violet. During the fight with the Aurakles, Katana accidentally uses the Soultaker on Lady Eve, while King Kobra escapes.

Lady Eve in other media
 Lady Eve appears in the tie-in comics Justice League: The Animated Series Guide and Justice League Adventures #23.
 A variation of Lady Eve appeared in the Arrowverse series Black Lightning, portrayed by Jill Scott. Evelyn Stillwater-Ferguson is the owner of a funeral parlor who connects Tobias Whale with a secret group of corrupt leaders that gave him leadership over the 100. She also has ties to Peter Gambi. Lady Eve is later murdered by Tobias' men as part of a plan to frame Black Lightning and also avenging Joey Toledo when Peter Gambi left the blame of his death on Lady Eve's group. It was later revealed that she was an old friend of Lazarus Prime who taught him some of her tricks. Baron later found her picture on Gambi's computer when trying to find out who tried to have Gambi killed. Lady Eve was shown to be revived offscreen and is the head of the Ultimate O business where she starts to develop some competition with Lala and the remnants of the 100.
 Lady Eve appears in the animated film Batman: Soul of the Dragon voiced by Grey DeLisle. She is seen as a member of the Kobra cult. Lady Eve faces off against and is killed by Shiva.

Lady Liberty
Lady Liberty is the code-name assigned to four fictional characters.

First Lady Liberty
Lady Liberty is a member of the Force of July, a government sponsored superhero team. She first appeared in Batman and the Outsiders Annual #1 (1984). Her costume consists of robes and a crown based on the Statue of Liberty, and she speaks with a French accent. Although not explored fully, it is alluded to in comics that she is romantically involved with Major Victory (William Vickers). Her real identity is never revealed.

She appears in the Outsiders 1987 special, fighting off a combined Outsiders/Infinity Inc. infiltration of the Force's California headquarters. Her team is initially successful, subduing and capturing all of the heroes.

Lady Liberty appears again during the Janus Directive crossover event among multiple series. The Suicide Squad is manipulated into attacking the group and Liberty suffers the death of two of her allies, Mayflower and Sparkler. This was because Amanda Waller, the head of the Squad, had to keep up the hoax that she had been replaced by a double that was hostile to American interests. Nevertheless, the rest of the Force joins in on an attack against Kobra, the driving force behind the Directive. During the mission, her ally, Silent Majority perishes. Liberty sacrifices herself to destroy Kobra's capability to kill millions.

Second Lady Liberty
In Crisis Aftermath: The Battle for Blüdhaven #1 (June 2006), a new Lady Liberty appears with a new Silent Majority and Major Victory. They call themselves Freedom's Ring and are employed by the government to defend Blüdhaven from any trespassing metahumans. This Lady Liberty is killed by Nuclear Legion member Geiger in the following issue.

Third Lady Liberty
When S.H.A.D.E. takes control of Freedom's Ring, the Lady Liberty equipment is passed to an unnamed agent who takes up the role. Two issues later she is stabbed through the chest by Ravager and dies. Silent Majority also dies in this conflict.

Fourth Lady Liberty
Another S.H.A.D.E. agent appears as Lady Liberty in the pages of Uncle Sam and the Freedom Fighters #4. As her powers stem from her costume, she is stripped of her robes and left, naked and devoid of powers, on a naturist beach by the Ray (Stan Silver). Apparently she rejoins S.H.A.D.E. with new equipment, still fighting against the Freedom Fighters team.

Lady Quark

Lady Shiva

Lady Styx

Lady Vic

Ladybug
Ladybug is a fictional character appearing in American comic books published by DC Comics.

In her panel seen within the pages of "The New Golden Age" #1, Rosibel Rivera immigrated to the United States with her parents Miguel and Ana. The Rivera family established Big Bee Ranch where they met Rick Raleigh. When Big Bee Ranch was vandalized by gangsters who wanted the Rivera family to pay them protection money, Red Bee saved them. Unfortunately, the local chief of police was corrupt and had the criminals freed with the charges against them dropped. Rosibel made her own costume and helped Red Bee expose the corrupt chief of police. As a thanks to Red Bee, Miguel and Ana offered their farm for Red Bee to use as a hideout. Upon stumbling onto Red Bee's hideout, Rosibel was exposed to a confiscated weapon of Professor Pollen that shrunk her to the size of a ladybug. Luckily for Rosibel, Red Bee was able to reverse the effects of the weapon. As a side-effect, Rosibel gained size-shifting abilities. She then built a ladybug- themed outfit complete with working wings as she becomes Red Bee's sidekick and morale booster. Ladybug assisted Red Bee in his different crimefighting activities until the day she mysteriously vanished. By the final issue of "Flashpoint Beyond", Ladybug was among the thirteen missing Golden Age superheroes in the Time Masters' capsules. When those capsules have failed, they were all pulled back to their own time with history rebuilding around them.

Ladybug was among the Lost Children on Childminder's island. She mentions her connection with Red Bee to Stargirl.

Lagomorph

Lagoon Boy

Laham

Laira

Lan Dibbux

Larry Lance

Lois Lane

Lucy Lane

Sam Lane

Lana Lang

Francine Langstrom
Francine Lee-Langstrom was the fiancée of scientist Kirk Langstrom at the time that she first encountered Batman. It was Batman who first revealed to Francine that Kirk had mutated himself into the feral Man-Bat. At one point, Batman had captured the Man-Bat and tried to give him an antidote to his condition, but the Man-Bat fought him at every turn. He even tried bringing Francine to the Batcave in the hopes that she could convince Langstrom to take the antidote willingly.

Kirk escaped, however, and when he next reunited with Francine, forced her to take the same bat gland extract that he had taken as proof of her love and devotion to him. Although Francine was terrified, she knew that somewhere within the Man-Bat's insanity lay the soul of the man she loved. Francine took the serum and like Kirk, mutated into a creature with bat-like qualities. The two "Man-Bats" decided to marry one another. At their wedding, they donned latex masks to disguise their features, but Batman interrupted the ceremony and exposed them in front of all their guests. Batman fought against Francine and Kirk and was finally able to defeat them by using the cathedral’s bells to incapacitate them. Upon doing so, Batman administered his cure to both of them, turning them back to normal.

A few months later, the Langstroms traveled to Las Vegas, Nevada, to study a rare breed of vampire bat that had surfaced following underground nuclear tests in New Mexico. While examining one of the bats, Francine pricked her finger on a fang and the toxin activated the dormant Man-Bat gene that still resided in her body. She transformed into a monster once again, but this time with more vampiric characteristics, including enhanced strength. In this iteration, Francine could only transform into a She-Bat during the nights of the full moon.

An uncontrollable savage, Francine began terrorizing the streets of Las Vegas, biting victims upon the neck and drinking their blood. When news of her rampage reached Gotham City, Batman believed that it was Kirk Langstrom who had become the Man-Bat. He flew out to Vegas and fought the She-Bat on the roof of a Vegas casino. After the initial fight, Batman deduced that his opponent was not Kirk Langstrom at all, but Francine. Finding Kirk, the two tracked Francine to a cave where Batman ensnared her with his batrope. He then administered the same antidote he had used in the past and Francine was once again cured.

This treatment did not last long, however. A year later, a professor of Medieval history from Antioke University known as Baron Tyme used his sorcery to take control of Francine. Turning her back into the She-Bat, he had Francine attack and kill a former colleague of his named Professor Raymond Arthur. Kirk Langstrom became the Man-Bat again and used hypnosis to break Baron Tyme's hold over her. Kirk defeated Tyme and the sorcerer apparently died in his tower chamber when the room caught on fire.

Batman consulted with Langstrom about his wife's condition and insisted that he give Francine a full blood transfusion. Kirk brought Francine to his home town of Chicago where she lived with him at the Lakeshore Manor Apartments. He kept a steady vigil over her condition and fortunately for them both, the blood transfusion appeared to have cured her.

The Langstroms had two children, Rebecca and Aaron. While Rebecca was a normal human (excluding the times when her whole family was mutated into Man-Bats), Aaron was born a mutant bat-creature due to the serum in his parents' systems. She also served as the lead scientist for the Outsiders to help them with their missions.

In 2011, "The New 52" rebooted the DC universe. Francine Langstrom is reimagined as a more villainous character. In this new  timeline, she met Kirk as a research assistant and supposedly loved him for his conviction in developing the Man-Bat serum for curing deafness. When Kirk transformed into the Man-Bat to help cure the city of the Man-Bat epidemic, she decided to bring Kirk back so he could perfect the formula for its original purpose, then she would take the formula herself and transform into the She-Bat. With some reported deaths Kirk began to think that he lacked control over the beast, but he discovered that Francine's Man-Bat formula differentiated from his as the bat she used was a South American vampire bat. It is revealed that Francine only married Kirk to ensure the company that he would complete the serum and then have him killed so she could inherit a large sum of money. She developed her own serum after Kirk turned into the Man-Bat in order to keep her job. Kirk tried to help cure her, but she preferred her new form and attacked Kirk, but ultimately refused to kill him. Kirk combined the two serums in order to become a stronger beast and defeat Francine, and Francine mocked him by acknowledging that he could only beat her by becoming like her. She is later charged for the murders that she committed as the She-Bat.

She is later released from Arkham by the Penguin and sent to attack Harley Quinn, demonstrating that she has much better control over her transformation than Kirk does. She injects the Man-Bat formula into Harley and her friend Tony to turn them into Man-Bats. However, Harley ultimately regains control over herself after Francine threatens Harley's friends and defeats the She-Bat.

Francine Langstrom in other media
 Francine Langstrom appears in media set in the DC Animated Universe, voiced by Meredith MacRae.
 Introduced in Batman: The Animated Seriess first episode "On Leather Wings", she meets Bruce Wayne with her father Dr. March and husband Kirk Langstrom before later becoming caught in the battle between Batman and her husband after he was mutated into the Man-Bat. After Batman cures Kirk, Francine is reunited with her husband. She returns in the episode "Terror in the Sky", having been exposed to a fruit bat-based serum Dr. March was working on in an attempt to recreate the Man-Bat formula and transformed into She-Bat. However, she loses all memory as She-Bat when she reverts back and believes Kirk had taken the formula again when the Man-Bat seemingly returns. This eventually leads to her leaving Kirk, believing he lied to her, but Kirk proves her wrong with Batman's help and convinces her to stay. While Francine transforms into She-Bat and kidnaps Kirk, Batman pursues her and administers an antidote, curing her.
 Francine also makes a cameo appearance in The New Batman Adventures episode "Chemistry", attending Bruce Wayne's wedding alongside Kirk.
 Francine Langstrom appears in the animated film Son of Batman, voiced by Diane Michelle. She and her daughter Rebecca are taken hostage by Deathstroke to force Kirk Langstrom to create multiple Man-Bat serums, but are later rescued by Batman.
 Francine Langstrom appears in Batman: Arkham Knight. She and her husband Kirk Langstrom were developing a vampire bat-based serum to cure deafness, but Kirk transformed into a feral, bat-like creature upon testing it on himself and attacked Francine, seemingly killing her. While investigating the Langstroms' laboratory, Batman finds Francine's corpse. If Batman revisits the lab after curing Kirk and incarcerating him however, he finds Francine's body gone and a broken television screen with the words "Forever my love" written on it.
 Francine Langstrom appears in DC Super Hero Girlss two-part episode "#NightmareInGotham", as She-Bat.

Lara

Larfleeze

Bat Lash

Lashina

Lashorr

Zoe Lawton
Zoe Lawton was created by Christos N. Gage and Steven Cummings. She made her first appearance in Deadshot #1.

The daughter of Michelle Torres and Deadshot (Floyd Lawton), Zoe Lawton was conceived following a casual liaison. Her mother gave up prostitution and drugs for Zoe's sake and moved them to a poor neighborhood in Star City, where she was raised for four years without her father's knowledge of her existence.

Zoe and her mother are approached by Deadshot during the "Urban Renewal" arc, who has recently learned of her existence at last. She is babysat by Deadshot, with whom she bonds. Later, when Deadshot is forced to leave his family for their own protection, she is granted admittance to a good school, thanks to his connections.

Spending time with her father and mother in a park during the "Six Days of Devastation" storyline, Zoe is present when they are suddenly attacked by Lady Vic and Double Dare. She and her mother are allowed to flee by the assassins, but return to assist Deadshot. She is the reason that Deadshot does not kill any of his assailants. Later, she is present when her father calls her mother and informs her that he will never see either of them again for their own safety.

Zoe Lawton in other media
 Zoe makes non-speaking cameo appearance at the end of Batman: Assault on Arkham, present on the rooftop as her father has Amanda Waller in his sights.
 Zoe appears as a minor supporting character in Suicide Squad, portrayed by Shailyn Pierre-Dixon.
 Zoe makes non-speaking cameo appearance during Suicide Squad: Hell to Pay, living in Lacoma, Utah.
 Zoe appears in flashbacks in Arrow in the episode "Suicidal Tendencies", portrayed by Audrey Wise Alvarez. This version of the character appears to be his legitimate daughter with Susan Lawton.

Legion

Lori Lemaris

Liberty Belle

Lightning

Lilith Clay

Livewire

Lion-Mane
Lion-Mane is the name of four characters in DC Comics.

Lion-Mane
The first Lion-Mane resided on Earth-Two. This version was a human with feline features and heightened strength. He was initially a henchman of that world's Catwoman who betrayed him and buried the loot in the forest. Lion-Mane was captured after that. Years later, Lion-Mane orchestrated a prison riot and took the guards hostage. Huntress infiltrated the prison and challenged Lion-Mane into a 1-on-1 fight. If she won, Lion-Mane would release the hostages, or if Lion-Mane won, she would have to reveal the location of the treasure Catwoman buried in the forest. The fight was tough and almost a draw, but eventually Huntress was able to defeat Lion-Mane. In the meantime, police had arrived and with nobody leading the prisoners, they were easily captured.

Ed Dawson
Archaeologist and lion-hunter Ed Dawson touched a mystical meteor called Mithra which transforms him into a were-lion. He retained his mind, but as he saw some lions in captivity, he couldn't control his killing urges. While being feral from the lion's presence, he battled Hawkman. But the first meteor wasn't pure; the transformation would eventually kill him. Hawkman saved him by smashing the Mithra stone and Edward reverted to human. Hawkman theorized that the Mithra Meteor contains some radiation that transforms the one who touches it into Lion-Mane who then represents an alien race who wants to terraform this planet. Days later, Dawson continues his criminal career as the Lion-Mane when he found another Mithra stone in a museum. He didn't know that Hawkman was his friend, Carter Hall, standing next to him. Edward, again sensing that a lion is in captivity, attacked nearby civilians. Hawkman tried to stop him but failed and was knocked out. Edward wanted to be a super-powered human. With this goal he sought other meteor pieces to increase his power and also to stay alive as Lion-Mane. With each meteor rock he touched his powers grew. Hawkman and Hawkgirl managed to find him again and defeat him; Hawkman thought that he might still carry some pieces of the first meteor rock in his pockets, and smashed them with a stone, reverting Edward back to human once more.

Ed Dawson later had a nightmare of him turning into Lion-Mane again and killing Hawkman. Edward Dawson was invited to the museum where Hawkman worked, and he was considered to take Carter's place. When the museum chairmen take their time to discuss the issue, Dawson was kidnapped and dragged to the basement. There he was made to touch one of the Mithra Meteor pieces, Edward tried to resist but he was overpowered by the strength of his Thanagarian captors and he transformed into Lion-Mane. He first killed the two musclemen who forced him to touch the stone and then he turned to Coral Shilak, who orchestrated it. He didn't got far, as Hawkman and Hawkgirl heard Coral's scream and arrived shortly after that. In the fight, Lion-Mane managed to grab a spear from Hawkman's hands and thrust it through the hero. Lion-Mane then takes his leave and starts to remold the world in his image. Lion-Mane's powers were still growing. He even affected people miles away and started to transform a selected few into Lion-Men. Hawkgirl tried to fight him but her efforts were useless. In a last resort, she grabbed him and flew high up. The cold at that height turned Lion-Mane back to Ed Dawson. Ed was then carried away to a hospital after that.

The character was initially removed from continuity post-Crisis/Hawkworld, but reappeared years later in the Hawkman ongoing series starring the Golden Age Hawkman and the modern Hawkgirl (Kendra Saunders). In this incarnation, Ed Dawson was an archaeologist looking for the Mithra stone with Karen Ramis. When she examined it, Ed witnessed her transforming into Lion-Mane. When it was repelled from Karen Ramis by Hawkman, Ed Dawson broke into the Mount St. Croix lab where the meteor was. It transformed him into Lion-Mane. When it came to his fight with Hawkman, Karen touched the stone taking half of the Lion-Mane power, enough for Ed to be apprehended. It was also revealed during this time that a previous hawk avatar (presumed to be Gabriel) and a lion avatar had previously battled each other.

Some months later, Fadeaway Man approached Ed Dawson and invited Dawson to join him and the other enemies of Hawkman making him a member of Alexander Luthor Jr.'s Secret Society of Super Villains. Lion-Mane managed to poison Hawkman. It didn't have long term consequences however and Hawkman got away. Fadeaway Man tried again at one of the parties where Hawkman was attending. This time they were able to kidnap him. Lion-Mane and the gang went for breakfast in a local diner, while the Thought Terror was working on Hawkman. Hawkman was rescued by Hawkgirl and Golden Eagle, but his perception was altered and he saw Hawkgirl as an enemy; he beat her almost to death. Lion-Mane then set some explosive charges around the city as did others of his group. By blowing up buildings they caught Hawkman's attention, which was part of the plan. The Manhawks arrived, but they only were there to prevent Hawkman from escaping. The gang then took turns in beating Hawkman; Lion-Mane got over zealous and tossed Hawkman into a burning building. Hawkman recovered and tried to escape, but the Manhawks attacked him. Fadeaway Man let them do their job and left with his gang. Lion-Mane got his payment and went to vacation in Africa, where he was loved and treated as king. His happiness was a brief one, as Hawkman had returned from the dead and attacked him with an axe demanding to know the whereabouts of Fadeaway Man.

In his fight with Hawkman, Lion-Mane was severely injured including the loss of his right eye.

When Deathstroke's team attacked a prison to attack Bombshell, Lion-Man took the opportunity to escape.

The cover of Justice League of America (vol. 2) #13 shows a member of the Injustice League that appears to be Lion-Mane, though this was not corroborated by the story.

During the "Brightest Day" storyline, Hawkman and Hawkgirl encountered a tribe of alien creatures resembling Lion-Mane on Hawkworld. They are called the Lion-Mane Pride. So far, there is no connection to them and the actual Lion-Mane.

Karen Ramis
A third Lion-Mane was introduced post-Zero Hour. A female scientist named Karen Ramis was transformed into Lion-Mane (a Lion Avatar) by the Mithra Meteor. She didn't want its power and that was how she was saved. Hawkman convinced her to fight the avatar and it left her seeking another host. Although now back to her human form, she still craved the meteor's power as it was more addictive than any other drug. When Hawkman was battling Ed Dawson, Karen used the only way to stop him as she again touched the Mithra Meteorite. She was repowered, but not quite Lion-Mane as she had been transformed into a near lion-like state. Karen fled afterwards and hasn't been seen since.

Lion-Mane IV
In The New 52 (a reboot DC's continuity launched in 2011), a fourth version of Lion-Mane is introduced. This version has a Wemic-like appearance. Lion-Mane ruled over the Marubunta Diamond Mines in Africa. When Batwing came to Africa to shut down the Marubunta Diamond Mines, Lion-Mane was confident that his three wives could beat him. When Lion-Mane's three wives were defeated, Lion-Mane confronted Batwing himself. Despite Batwing's technological edge, Lion-Mane's physical might was too much for the hero to handle. Batwing gave up a good fight landing plenty of hits in the process, but ultimately Lion-Mane had Batwing at his mercy. It was then that Batwing called in his vehicle and it smashed Lion-Mane into a wall, knocking him out. The villain was then being transported via plane by authorities, but the Marabunta attacked and successfully took over the plane. They told Lion-Mane they were going to kill him, but the locked-up villain then bit off the gunman's arm. All of the other characters opened fire and shot him several times, but he was fine. Lion-Mane swiftly tore apart his enemies and then jumped from the plane.

During the "Forever Evil" storyline, Lion-Mane is among the villains recruited by the Crime Syndicate of America to join their Secret Society of Super Villains. Lion-Mane appears in Cheetah's Menagerie where they subdue Steve Trevor and Killer Frost. While Steve Trevor knocks out Cheetah, Lion-Mane is among the Menagerie members that are frozen by Killer Frost.

Lion-Mane in other media
 Lion-Mane appears in DC Universe Online. He appears as one of the Cat Avatars alongside Cheetah Claw, Panther Fang, and Tiger Eye. The players encounter him in Gotham University where he has the Cat's Eye of Power. The players managed to defeat him with the help of the Lion Cubs that were harvested from the Lion Lords.
 Lion-Mane made his animated debut in the DC Super Hero Girls web series, voiced by Khary Payton.
 Lion-Mane is mentioned (but does not appear in person) by a reporter in a 1997 Baby Ruth commercial featuring Hawkman.

Lobo

Gillian B. Loeb

Steve Lombard

Looker

Maxwell Lord

Lucifer

Lena Luthor

Lex Luthor

Lillian Luthor
Lillian Luthor was the mother of Alexander Luthor and Julian Luthor, as well as the wife of Lionel Luthor.

Smallville
Lillian (portrayed by Alisen Down) had a long and prolific role in the TV series Smallville.

Lillian came from a wealthy family. How she met Lionel is unclear, but they were married sometime before the 1980s. By all accounts, Lillian was a caring, beautiful and sophisticated person, as well as comments made by Lex and Lionel have indicated that she had a spirited personality, had ambitions of her own and often stood up to Lionel.

Eventually, Lillian began to wonder about the special projects that Lionel had. She searched for answers and found something called "Veritas". However, Alexander saw her going through his father's briefcase, so Lillian asked him not to tell anyone. When Lionel found out, he immediately blamed Alexander and forced him to tell the truth. When Alexander did, Lillian insisted Lionel explain what Veritas was, but Lionel knocked her to the floor instead and warned her not to look into his projects again. Lillian felt angered and disgusted by Alexander's betrayal.

Sometime later, Lillian became ill with a heart condition that worsened over the rest of her life. Lionel hired a nurse named Rachel Dunleavy to assist her. Rachel and Lionel subsequently had an affair, resulting in the birth of Lionel's illegitimate son, Lucas. It is unclear whether Lillian knew of the affair or the child.

Lillian was helped by a nanny, Pamela Jenkins, who Alexander regarded as a second mother. Lionel was often absent from home and Lillian insisted that he take Alexander on one of his business trips to Smallville during the meteor shower of 1989. Lionel's resulting shame and constant critique of Alexander bothered Lillian greatly.

Sometime in the early 1990s, Lionel insisted that they have another child, an idea that Lillian was highly opposed to, presumably because of her poor health. However, when Alexander was 11, Lillian became pregnant again. She insisted that Alexander be allowed to come home for school from Excelsior Academy and Lionel complied. Her pregnancy was strenuous and Lillian was bedridden for much of it. On Alexander's disastrous 12th birthday (which no one attended), Lillian gave him a lead box allegedly made from the armor of St. George, which he kept into adulthood and later gave to Clark Kent.

After baby Julian's birth, Lillian descended into a deep case of postpartum depression, refusing to hold the child and crying perpetually. One evening, Lionel sent the baby's nanny home and insisted that Lillian bond with the child. Lillian expressed her concern that Lionel would pit the two boys against each other and announced that she wanted a divorce, a threat that she had apparently made many times and that Lionel had called "tiresome".

On returning home from work one night, Lionel discovered Alexander in the baby's nursery. Alexander immediately apologized and confessed to accidentally killing Julian while trying to stop him from crying. Lionel erupted into a fierce rage and struck Alexander. Their relationship never recovered, even after he became an adult. It was not until years later, after receiving experimental therapy to recall repressed memories, that he remembered that Lillian had in fact smothered the baby during one of her delusions, hoping to spare him from Lionel's maltreatment. Alexander took the blame, correctly assuming that his father would cover it up in order to protect his sole heir, although he would probably be less inclined to do so for his wife.

Sometime before her death Lillian, along with Lex and Lionel, went to a ranch in Montana to spend time together. During that time, a snake spooked Lillian's horse, prompting Lionel to save her and wait on her until she was better.

After Julian's death, Lillian's health rapidly deteriorated and she died several months later in the spring of 1993 when Alexander was 13. He later confessed to Clark that he was in denial about her impending death and spent the time researching treatments and doctors instead of being with her. Lex also told Lana Lang that he was away at boarding school when Lillian died and found out about her passing from reporters who had sneaked into his school.

Lillian left her shares of LuthorCorp to her son and Pamela.

Lillian's death was extremely influential in the adult Lex's life. He had visions of his mother on many occasions. When Lex was shot and ended up in a coma, he had a near-death experience. In it, Lillian visited him and showed Lex an alternate life of happiness that he could have if he would simply walk away from Lionel and LuthorCorp. However, at the end of the vision, Lana (his dream wife) suffered complications during childbirth. Because of Lex's lack of resources and estrangement from his father, he was unable to transfer Lana to a better facility and she died: this led Lex to believe that Lana died because he lacked enough money and power: with these, everything else in life could be secured. As a result, Lex ignored his mother's warning and continued his lifestyle of deceit and corruption. After realizing this, Lillian was seen in the reflection of a hospital window crying over her son's choice.

When Lex was injected with the Limbo drug, which placed its users in a state of "clinical death", he met Lillian again, who told him that she was angry with him for ignoring her advice.

When Lex was shot and went into a coma, Clark Kent and Lionel used a machine that allowed Clark to enter Lex's mind in order to find Lois Lane and Kara Kent. In Lex's mind, Clark met a young version of Lex and the two hid from a psychotic and murderous adult Lex. In the memory featuring Lillian snooping in Lionel's briefcase, Clark witnessed Lionel's verbal and physical abuse of both Lex and Lillian, as well as watched Lex try to help his mother up, but Lillian uncharacteristically told him that he had done enough and walked away from him.

Lillian Luthor in comics
In DC Comics, Lex Luthor's mother is named Arlene Luthor. In later incarnations, her name was changed to "Leticia" even though she remained unnamed in most of her appearances.

Lillian Luthor in other media
Lillian Luthor (known as the Doctor) appeared in Supergirl, portrayed by Brenda Strong. Dr. Lillian Luthor is a scientist, the leader of Project Cadmus, the wife of the late Lionel Luthor, the mother of Lex Luthor and the adoptive mother of Lena Luthor. She and her team were the ones responsible for turning John Corben and Hank Henshaw into Metallo and Cyborg Superman respectively. After Metallo had an encounter with Supergirl and Superman, Project Cadmus eventually reveals that it has gone rogue, and is waging war against all alien life on Earth. Lillian is arrested after a failed attempt to wipe out all aliens in National City with a Kryptonian bioweapon but is later freed by Metallo. Lillian is estranged from Lena since her husband favors her over their son, and blamed Lena's mother for the deterioration of her relationship with Lionel. During the Daxamite invasion, she briefly allies with Kara in order to rescue Mon-El and Lena from Rhea, and helps Lena and Winn prepare a weapon that will disperse lead in Earth's atmosphere to drive away the Daxamites. In season three episode, "For Good", Lillian later targets Morgan Edge after he poisoned Lena which leads to both of them being defeated by Supergirl and Jimmy Olsen and arrested by the authorities. In season four, Lena has her mother placed on work release when it came to developing the antidote for the Harun-El. Lillian and Lena are later invited to the White House by Lex to watch the Claymore satellite destroy Argo. In season five where the aftermath of the Crisis has created Earth-Prime, Lena finds that her mother is now the head of the Luthor Foundation. Lex later talks to Lillian about his plans involving Leviathan. After swiping the bottle containing Rama Khan, Tezumak, and Sela from a weakened Brainiac 5, Lex meets up with Lilian and gives her the bottle so that they can begin his next plot. In season six, Lillian copied the abilities of the Leviathan operatives into Lex and claimed that his plan won't work. She and Otis later ambushed Alex and Brainiac 5 during Lex's broadcast and fled when the satellites were destroyed. Lillian visited Lex in prison and gave him her "I told you so" comment. Lena then appears and uses Myriad to erase their memories of Supergirl's identity.

Lionel Luthor

Lock-Up
Lock-Up is a fictional character appearing in American comic books published by DC Comics.

Batman: The Animated Series
Before appearing in the comics, Lock-Up appeared in his self-titled episode of Batman: The Animated Series, voiced by Bruce Weitz. Lyle Bolton is a large, muscular man specializing in incarceration and high tech security systems. Bruce Wayne recommends Bolton, a security expert at Wayne Enterprises, for the position of chief of security at Arkham Asylum. Once in charge, Bolton turns Arkham into a police state, using intimidation, excessive force and even torture to keep the inmates in line by threatening them and taking away their privileges even when they behaved, and chaining them down and electrifying their cell doors every night. At one point, he holds Ventriloquist's dummy Scarface over a can filled with termites. The inmates are all terrified of Bolton to the point that the Scarecrow, the "Master of Fear" himself, escapes from Arkham just to get away from him, only to be recaptured by Batman and Robin. After seeing how Scarecrow was terrified of Bolton, Wayne becomes suspicious about how Bolton is keeping the Arkham inmates in check so well. Bruce sets up a hearing with Mayor Hamilton Hill, Commissioner James Gordon, and Dr. Bartholomew: Arkham Asylum's Chief of Medicine. After questioning the inmates of Arkham, including Ventriloquist and Scarface, Harley Quinn and the Scarecrow, Wayne finds it odd that none of them are willing to say anything and only heap compliments on Bolton. Wayne also notices that the guard is able to quiet them with a mere glare. However, after slyly suggesting a possible extension of Bolton's contract to eighteen months, the inmates panic and finally admit to Bolton's reign of terror. Enraged at the inmates ratting him out, Bolton assaults several Arkham orderlies and attempts to attack his accusers only to be stopped by Wayne tripping him. He then has to be physically dragged out of the hearing upon Dr. Bartholomew telling him that he is dismissed from his job. As he is dragged away, Bolton states that he now sees the inmates as a symptom of a much greater disease, brought about by gutless police, mindless bureaucrats, and coddling doctors. Bolton then vows revenge.

Determined to bring his own brand of order to Gotham City, Bolton recreates himself as Lock-Up, a costumed vigilante dedicated to ridding Gotham of anyone he deems a threat to a secure society. He first kidnaps reporter Summer Gleason, whom he thinks is glamorizing Gotham's criminals by covering them on the news. Batman sees this happening and attempts to stop Bolton. Bolton offers Batman an alliance, but Batman refuses. Despite his efforts, Batman is unable to stop Lock-Up before he escapes. Batman identifies Bolton as Lock-Up by a lock he'd used on a door. Lock-Up then kidnaps Dr. Bartholmew from Arkham, and then kidnaps Gordon as he is attempting to call Batman on the Bat Signal. Gordon and Bartholomew's kidnapping is mentioned to Batman by Detective Harvey Bullock after he is found trapped and handcuffed near the signal which he managed to turn on with difficulty. Bolton then uses a smokescreen to kidnap Mayor Hill right from under Batman and the police's noses.

Lock-Up holds his victims hostage aboard USS Halsey F-84, a decommissioned destroyer that acted as a temporary prison while Stonegate Penitentiary was being constructed. Batman and Robin find and defeat him before he can dispose of the hostages.

Deemed insane himself, Lock-Up is then imprisoned in Arkham Asylum where the inmates he once tormented mock him, and the Scarecrow vows revenge against him. When placed in his cell, Lock-Up quotes "They thought they could trap me in a world with lunatics, but I showed them! Now I can keep an eye on everyone. They'll never slip past me again".

History in the comics
Lock-Up's first comic appearance was in Robin (vol. 2) #24 (January 1996) in which he captured Charaxes. He subsequently appeared in Detective Comics #694 (February 96) in which he captured the minor villain Allergent. In both of these stories, he only made a brief appearance at the end, removing the villain before Batman and Robin could return to the scene.

His first full appearance was in Detective Comics #697-699 (June–August 1996), which began with him capturing Two-Face and taking him to his private prison alongside Charaxes, Allergent, and several gangsters. He is stopped by the police while targeting a criminal-turned-state's evidence and is revealed to be Lyle Bolton, previously discharged from the police academy for being too gung-ho, and dismissed from several security jobs (unlike the animated version, he had not worked at Arkham). Lock-Up escapes, and captures minor street criminal Alvin Draper (actually Tim Drake's undercover identity).

When Nightwing finds his hideout, Lock-Up decides to drown all his prisoners in an underwater death-trap. Batman intervenes and defeats Lock-Up, saving the villains, Nightwing, and Robin.

Lock-Up later appeared during the No Man's Land storyline, having taken control of Blackgate Penitentiary in the aftermath of the earthquake. He had enlisted KGBeast and the Trigger Twins to act as wardens for his prison, and rules with an iron fist; Batman only tolerates his presence because he requires Lock-Up to keep captured criminals in check to prevent Gotham being overrun, although Lock-Up is under strict orders to treat the prisoners well. Towards the end of the storyline, Batman enlists Dick Grayson's help in overthrowing Lock-Up so Blackgate could be used for the lawful side once again.

Lock-Up makes a very brief appearance in Villains United: Infinite Crisis Special where it seems the Society made use of Lock-Up's prison expertise to break metas and humans out of prisons all over the world, leading to the Battle of Metropolis in the final issue of Infinite Crisis.

More recently, Lock-Up has been affiliated with Ventriloquist II, alongside other Gotham criminals Killer Moth and Firefly. During this association, Lock-Up was badly wounded by Metropolis outfits Intergang and the 100.

Recovering, Lock-Up was sent to a prison world alongside other criminals in the Salvation Run limited series.

Lunkhead
Lunkhead is an enemy of Batman who became an inmate at Arkham Asylum. Lunkhead was clearly stupid, but exhibited massive strength; he made an enemy of the Ventriloquist (Arnold Wesker) when he smashed Wesker's companion, Scarface. He was sacrificed to the devil by a pack of demons, along with many others, when the Ventriloquist threw his voice to make it seem as though Lunkhead was volunteering to be thrown into the fiery pit with the rest of the damned.

Lunkhead in other media
 Lunkhead appears in Beware the Batman, voiced by JB Blanc. He is a reformed criminal who was beaten into a coma for two months by Batman. He was part of a therapy program in Blackgate Penitentiary alongside Margaret Sorrow, and was ultimately reformed and released.
 Lunkhead appears in the Gotham episode "A Dark Knight: One of My Three Soups", portrayed by Hank Strong. This version is an African-American strongman and had known Jerome Valeska's uncle Zachary Trumble. When he showed up to assist Zachary, Jerome spilled some soup on him. Upon Bruce Wayne arriving, he fought against Lunkhead and defeated him.

Anthony Lupus
Anthony Lupus is a former Olympic Decathlon champion who suffers from severe headaches until he meets Prof. Achilles Milo, who uses a drug to treat them. This treatment also turns Lupus into a werewolf. Milo discovers that Lupus suffers from lycanthropy, which is the source of Anthony's headaches. With a serum derived from the Alaskan timber wolf, Milo sends Anthony's condition into overdrive transforming him into a full werewolf with the full moon even as Milo claims that he can cure advanced lycanthropy. In his first outing, Anthony Lupus' werewolf form enters the apartment of a woman and kills her pet dog. Before the Werewolf could kill the woman, Batman arrived and rescued the woman. After the scuffle, the Werewolf reunited with Professor Milo and regressed back to Anthony Lupus when dawn rose, and Lupus claims that the transformations are getting worse. To get the cure, Anthony will have to kill Batman. To facilitate the murder plot, Lupus puts out a charity donation that he wants Batman to deliver. When Batman arrives at Lupus' house, he is tricked into a locked room where knockout gas is pumped into it. When Milo has Batman chained in an abandoned lot, he wants Anthony to finish the job if he wants the cure. When Anthony states that he will lose control of this transformation, Milo does not care. Upon Anthony transforming into the Werewolf, he attacks Milo first where the cure is destroyed during the attack. Upon breaking free as a storm begins, Batman fights the Werewolf several stories above the ground and manages to impale the Werewolf with a metallic rod. Just then, a lightning bolt strikes the metallic rod that impaled the Werewolf. This causes the Werewolf's burning body to fall to the ground. When Batman made it to the ground where the Werewolf landed, all he found was a charred metallic rod. Not long after this, there is news in Alaska about a man hunting wolves and a beast leading a wolf pack that is starting to spread in the Alaskan wilderness.

Bruce Wayne later met Anthony's younger sister Angela who is in need of a much-needed bone marrow transplant. When Commissioner Gordon states that Anthony Lupus was sighted in Alaska, Batman initially doubts that he survived their last encounter but he shames mayoral candidate Arthur Reeves by going to Alaska to investigate. Upon meeting with the president of the environmental agency, Bruce Wayne persuades him to help look. When Bruce Wayne and the environmental agency president find Anthony's hut in the middle of nowhere, they lock themselves in when the Werewolf attacks. After the environmental agency president escapes, Bruce Wayne becomes Batman and prepares a trap for the Werewolf only for it to trap a wolf. Upon the fight reaching the Trans-Alaska Pipeline System, Batman starts to get an advantage over the Werewolf. Using a silver net to trap the Werewolf and knock it unconscious until the sun comes up, Batman explains the situation with Angela to Anthony who is reluctant to return to Gotham City because of his Werewolf form. In order to persuade him to return, Batman promises Anthony that he will find a cure for his condition like Achilles Milo had.

A photo of Anthony Lupus' werewolf form was featured in Trinity (vol. 2) #7.

Anthony Lupus' werewolf form later appeared in Batman's hallucination.

Anthony Lupus' werewolf form appears in the DC Rebirth. He is one of the many villains taken down by Batman and Catwoman after he takes her along with him on an average night of his job.

Anthony Lupus in other media
 A character inspired by Anthony Lupus named Anthony Romulus appears in the Batman: The Animated Series episode "Moon of the Wolf", voiced by Harry Hamlin. This version is a well-known Olympian athlete from Gotham City. After entering a decathlon, despite immersing himself in intense physical training, he does not feel confident in his abilities and asks Professor Milo to make untraceable steroids for him. Milo obliged and, despite winning the decathlon, the wolf hormones he used to make the steroids gradually cause Romulus to transform into a werewolf. Milo blackmails him into working for him in exchange for a cure, but Romulus eventually runs afoul of Batman, who defeats him and sends him falling into a river.
 Anthony Romulus appears in issue #21 of The Batman Adventures, Doctor Emile Dorian uses him, Tygrus, and Man-Bat to capture Catwoman, with Romulus demanding a cure following the mission. However, the villains are all caught in an explosion while fighting Batman.

Lynx

References
  Some of the content in this article was copied from La Dama at the DC wiki, which is licensed under the Creative Commons Attribution-Share Alike 3.0 (Unported) (CC-BY-SA 3.0) license.
 

 DC Comics characters: L, List of